Viking is a town in central Alberta, Canada.

The town also lends its name to the Viking Formation, an oil bearing stratigraphical unit.

History 
Viking was settled in 1909 by Scandinavian settlers Sivert Hafso and Ole Sorenson, from Norway.

On 7 July 2005, the community ice arena was severely damaged by fire. Construction began on a new arena, called the "Viking Carena Complex" and was completed on 17 August 2007.

Viking celebrated its centennial in 2009.

Geography

Climate 
Viking experiences a humid continental climate (Köppen climate classification Dfb). Summers are warm with moderate rainfall while winters are long and bitterly cold.

Demographics 

In the 2016 Census of Population conducted by Statistics Canada, the Town of Viking recorded a population of 1,083 living in 460 of its 505 total private dwellings, a  change from its 2011 population of 1,041.

Economy 
The majority of economic activity is in the agriculture, oil and gas, textile, and manufacturing industries.

Arts and culture 
Viking won the national Communities in Bloom contest in 2000.

Attractions 

Many parks and flower gardens are maintained throughout the town. One of the most notable parks is Troll Park, which celebrates Vikings's rich Scandinavian history with native plants, trolls hidden throughout the park, and a giant troll mountain.

Infrastructure 

As a flag stop, Via Rail's The Canadian calls at the Viking railway station.

Notable people 
Cory Clouston, former hockey coach
Murray Dorin, Canadian politician, Progressive Conservative MP (1984 - 1993)
Don Mazankowski, former politician
Donald Sanderlin, Olympian
Sutter family, a hockey family that includes Brent, Brian, Duane, Rich, Ron, and Darryl, all of whom formerly played professional hockey in the NHL

List of communities in Alberta
List of towns in Alberta

References

External links 

1909 establishments in Alberta
Beaver County, Alberta
Towns in Alberta